The assignment of telephone numbers in Poland is controlled by the Office of Electronic Communications (Urząd Komunikacji Elektronicznej or UKE), the national regulatory authority.

Geographic numbers

Number format
Polish telephone numbers have had 9 digits since 30 September 2009. The prefix '0' is no longer used when making a call within the country.

  xx xxx xx xx  (within Poland)
  +48 xx xxx xx xx  (outside Poland)

National area codes

Mobile numbers

Number format
9 digits, starting with 4, 5, 6, 7 or 8 (not all).

Mobile codes
   45x xxx xxx
   50x xxx xxx
   51x xxx xxx
   53x xxx xxx
   57x xxx xxx
   60x xxx xxx
   66x xxx xxx
   69x xxx xxx
   72x xxx xxx
   73x xxx xxx
   78x xxx xxx
   79x xxx xxx
   88x xxx xxx
The same codes are used by mobile virtual network operators.

Non-geographic numbers

Premium rate services
   70 xxx xx xx

Shared cost numbers
   801 xxx xxx

Free (for callers in Poland)
   800 xxx xxx

Other numbers

    Paging services
   64 x 000
   64 x xxx xxx
    Carrier Selection Code
   10xx
   10xxx
    UTR VSAT, Tekstofon, Fixed SMS
   802 xxx xxx
    UAN (universal number)
   804 xxx xxx
    VPN
   806 xxx xxx
    VCC
   808 xxx xxx
    VoIP
   39x xxx xxx
    NDSI – dialed access to data networks incl. Internet
   20 xx xx

References

External links
 Numbering lists and tables, UKE (in Polish)

Poland
Telecommunications in Poland
Telephone numbers